Edinburgh Woollen Mill (EWM) is a Carlisle-based retailer specialising in clothing, along with interests in homewares and destination shopping for tourists. It was previously owned by the Dubai-based British billionaire Philip Day.

The company's core Edinburgh Woollen Mill stores have traditionally targeted men and women over the age of 40, but the business has expanded into new markets in recent years, most notably through the acquisition of value fashion retailer Peacocks in 2012.

In May 2018, Edinburgh Woollen Mill announced plans to move their HQ from Langholm to Carlisle.

History
The company was founded in 1946 by Drew Stevenson as the Langholm Dyeing and Finishing Company Limited, dyeing wool yarn to order. His eldest son David, until recently the chairman of the EWM Group, opened the first retail store in Randolph Place, Edinburgh, in 1970. In 1972, the first English store was opened in Carlisle.

Having been owned by several equity holdings over the previous decade the company was bought out by the newly formed EWM Group and was then subject to a secondary, management takeover in 2002, led by the current chief executive, Phillip Day.

In 2011, the group bought Jane Norman out of administration, having bought Ponden Mills, and merged it with 80 stores bought from the collapsed Rosebys home furnishings store to create Ponden Home.

On 22 February 2012, it was announced that EWM had purchased the Peacocks clothing retail brand along with 388 stores and concessions, its headquarters and logistics functions. Although over 200 stores were not acquired at this time, the chain has embarked on a programme of expansion since.

In 2016 EWM purchased the Austin Reed brand, the British fashion retailer founded in 1900,

EWM placed Jane Norman into administration in June 2014, but retained the brand and stock to sell as an online-only business.

In May 2017, it was understood that EWM had bought the Jaeger brand and debt (but not the main company, or payments to its suppliers) from its former owner, Better Capital.

In May 2017, EWM opened the first Days (department store), in what had been the BHS premises in Guildhall Square, Carmarthen, which will house Peacocks, Edinburgh Woollen Mill, Ponden Home, Jane Norman, and Austin Reed brands. This is intended to be the first of a chain of Days department stores.

In May 2020, Bangladesh Garment Manufacturers and Exporters Association in a letter to Philip Day had warned that they would blacklist EWM for non-payment of suppliers in Bangladesh and not returning their calls. The COVID-19 pandemic has resulted in orders being cancelled or retailers asking for heavy discounts which led to workers going without pay or being fired.

In November 2020, Edinburgh Woollen Mill was placed into administration.

In January 2021, it was announced that Marks & Spencer had acquired the Jaeger fashion brand but not Jaeger's 63 shops and 13 concessions, for £5 million.

In January 2021, it was announced that Edinburgh Woollen Mill, Ponden Homes and Bonmarché had been bought out of administration by an international consortium of investors who will inject fresh funds into the business (led by the existing management team).

In April 2021, it was announced that Peacocks had been brought out of administration by a senior executive backed by an international consortium of investors. Edinburgh Woollen Mill Group's chief operating officer Steve Simpson will take over the business.

Operations
The Edinburgh Woollen Mill Group Ltd (EWM Group) is the holding company for three core brands: Edinburgh Woollen Mill, Jane Norman and Peacocks. As of spring 2016, the group operates close to a thousand stores in the UK, comprising:

265 Edinburgh Woollen Mill stores
479 Peacocks stores
107 Ponden Home stores
88 tourist shops and visitor centres trading under various fascias (e.g. James Pringle Weavers)
27 destination sites combining all the Group's concepts (e.g. Masson Mill)
A number of tourist attractions, including the Scottish Deer Centre in Fife and the Scottish Wool Centre in Perthshire.

The Peacocks brand is also franchised internationally.

In April 2017 EWM made a substantial loan to Carlisle United Football Club. This was seen by some to be a move aimed at eventually taking full control of the club.

In October 2020, EWM,  which at that time had 24,000 employees, announced it planned to restructure.

References

External links
 
Corporation Website

1946 establishments in Scotland
Clothing companies established in 1946
Clothing companies of Scotland
Clothing retailers of Scotland
Companies based in Carlisle, Cumbria
Companies based in the Scottish Borders
Companies that have entered administration in the United Kingdom
Scottish brands